The following is a list of characters of The Andy Griffith Show, an American sitcom television series, starring Andy Griffith. The series ran for eight seasons on CBS between October 3, 1960, and April 1, 1968. Episodes 1–159 (1960–1965) were broadcast in black-and-white, while the last 90 episodes (1965–1968) were in color.

Characters are listed in order of their initial appearance. Only characters who appeared in 3 or more episodes are listed. For other characters, see List of The Andy Griffith Show guest stars

Legend
 = Main cast (credited)
 = Recurring cast (3+ episodes per season)
 = Guest cast (1-2 episodes per season)

Unseen regular characters

Notes

Andy Griffith
The Andy Griffith Show